The Amazonian marsh rat (Holochilus sciureus), also known as the common marsh rat, or simply the marsh rat, is a rodent species from South America.

Description
Amazonian marsh rats are smaller than the common brown rat, but otherwise have a similar appearance. They have short fur, which is tawny or buff over the back, becomes paler on the flanks, and fades to white or pale orange on the underparts. The hindfeet are noticeably larger than the forepaws, with prominent claws and partial webbing between the toes. There is also a slight fringe of longer, silvery, hair, around the soles of the feet. Females have eight or ten teats.

Distribution and habitat
Amazonian marsh rats are found across much of northern South America east of the Andes. Although the exact taxonomic status of some populations is unclear, two subspecies are currently recognised:

 Holochilus sciureus sciureus - Central Brazil, southern Colombia, eastern Peru and Ecuador, northern Bolivia
 Holochilus sciureus berbicensis - Venezuela, the Guianas, northern Brazil, eastern Colombia

Biology and behaviour
Amazonian marsh rats feed primarily on grass stems, although they also eat some seeds, and small quantities of sedges, other plants, and even small invertebrates. Females construct spherical nests made of leaves in order to rear their young. The inner lining of the nest consists of finely shredded leaves, with a more intact outer shell.

Predators include caimans, rattlesnakes, barn owls, hawks, kites, and probably crab-eating foxes.

They breed throughout the year, although the fertility of both sexes increases during periods of high rainfall. Courtship lasts around 4 days before mating occurs, and gestation lasts 29 days. The fur begins to appear after five days, and the first teeth emerge at ten days. The young are weaned a fifteen days, by which time their eyes have opened. The rats reach sexual maturity at three to four months, with females maturing more slowly than males.

References

Holochilus
Rodents of South America
Mammals of Brazil
Mammals of Colombia
Mammals of Peru
Fauna of the Amazon
Mammals described in 1842